The 15th Legislative Assembly of Saskatchewan was elected in the Saskatchewan general election held in April 1964. The assembly sat from February 4, 1965, to September 8, 1967. The Liberal Party led by Ross Thatcher formed the government. The Co-operative Commonwealth Federation (CCF) led by Woodrow Lloyd formed the official opposition.

James Snedker served as speaker for the assembly.

Members of the Assembly 
The following members were elected to the assembly in 1964:

Notes:

Party Standings 

Notes:

By-elections 
By-elections were held to replace members for various reasons:

Notes:

References 

Terms of the Saskatchewan Legislature